Joan Andrews may refer to:

Fictional characters
Joan Andrews, character in Best Friends Together
Joan Andrews, character in Night Time in Nevada

Other uses
Joan Andrews (politician), running mate of William A. Marra
Joan Andrews (ship), see Colonist